Turbonilla mumia is a species of sea snail, a marine gastropod mollusk in the family Pyramidellidae, the pyrams and their allies.

Description
The length of the shell varies between 1.8 mm and 3.5 mm.

Distribution
This marine species occurs off Japan, the Solomons and from Pakistan to Australia.

References

External links
 To Encyclopedia of Life
 To World Register of Marine Species

mumia
Gastropods described in 1861